Zahlbrucknerella is a genus of filamentous, rock-dwelling lichens in the family Lichinaceae.

Taxonomy
The genus was circumscribed by Albert William Herre in 1912. He had originally published the genus in 1910 as Zahlbrucknera, but later discovered that this name had already been used for a genus of flowering plants, and was thus not available for use. The genus is named for Alexander Zahlbruckner, "the eminent lichenologist, curator of the botanical section of the Imperial Natural History Museum, at Vienna, Austria". Aino Henssen emended the genus in 1977, adding five newly described species in the process.

Description
All species of Zahlbrucknerella have filamentous thallus that form olive, brown, or black tufts on rocks that are periodically inundated with water, like those in seepage channels or on the side of lakes and rivers. The  partner is from the genus Scytonema. Most species have 24 ascospores in their asci, while one has 8. Other Lichinaceae genera with a similar appearance, and with which Zahlbrucknerella has historically been confused, include Ephebe, Placynthium, and Spilonema.

Species
Most species in the genus have a limited range, although the type species has a world-wide distribution.
 Zahlbrucknerella africana  – South Africa
 Zahlbrucknerella calcarea  – Asia; Europe; Iceland; South Africa; North America
 Zahlbrucknerella californica  – California
 Zahlbrucknerella compacta  – New Zealand
 Zahlbrucknerella fabispora  – Colorado; Iceland; Karelia
 Zahlbrucknerella granitica 
 Zahlbrucknerella indica  – India
 Zahlbrucknerella marionensis  – Marion Island, Indian Ocean
 Zahlbrucknerella maritima  – Patagonia; Tierra del Fuego
 Zahlbrucknerella maxima  – Venezuela
 Zahlbrucknerella patagonica  – Patagonia; Antarctica

Species interactions
Lichenicolous fungi that have been recorded on Zahlbrucknerella lichens include Stigmidium parvum, Didymella parvispora, and Endococcus zahlbrucknerellae.

References

Lichinomycetes
Ascomycota genera
Lichen genera
Taxa described in 1912
Taxa named by Albert William Herre